William Augustus Oldford (born 1925) is a Canadian former social worker, magistrate and politician in Newfoundland. He represented Fortune Bay in the Newfoundland House of Assembly from 1971 to 1972 as a Liberal.

The son of Augustus Oldford and Hilda Rose, he was born in Burnside and was educated there and at Memorial University College. He taught school for four years and then worked as a welfare officer at Jackson's Arm from 1951 to 1958. He then served as a magistrate until 1971, when he stepped down from the bench to enter provincial politics. He served in the Newfoundland cabinet as a minister without portfolio and as Minister of Supply and Services.

Oldford resigned his seat in the assembly in January 1972, which gave the Progressive Conservative party a majority of seats. He was named a magistrate in March 1972 and served in Grand Falls and Wabush-Labrador City. He was a named a provincial court judge in Springdale in 1977, retiring from the bench in 1990.

Oldford married Mabel Caines.

References 

1925 births
Possibly living people
Judges in Newfoundland and Labrador
Liberal Party of Newfoundland and Labrador MHAs
Members of the Executive Council of Newfoundland and Labrador